Tritt is a surname. Notable people with the surname include:

Bill Tritt (1917–2011), American chief executive
Travis Tritt (born 1963), American country music singer